Tay Bridge may refer to:

 Tay Rail Bridge, across the Firth of Tay at Dundee, Scotland
 Tay Road Bridge, across the Firth of Tay at Dundee, Scotland
 Tay Bridge, another name for Wade's Bridge in Aberfeldy, Scotland 
 "Operation Tay Bridge" was also the codename for the funeral plans for Queen Elizabeth, The Queen Mother

See also
 Tay Bridge disaster
 :Category:Bridges across the River Tay, for other bridges across the River Tay
 The Tay Bridge Disaster, a poem written by Scottish poet William McGonagall